Borku or Borgu is a region of Central Africa, mostly in Northern Chad, forming part of the transitional zone between the arid wastes of the Sahara and the fertile lands of the central Sudan. It is bounded N. by the Tibesti Mountains, and is in great measure occupied by lesser elevations belonging to the same system. These hills to the south and east merge into the plains of Ouaddaï and Darfur. South-west, in the direction of Lake Chad, is the Bodele basin. The drainage of the country is to the lake, but the numerous khors with which its surface is scored are mostly dry or contain water for brief periods only. A considerable part of the soil is light sand drifted about by the wind. The irrigated and fertile portions consist mainly of a number of valleys separated from each other by low and irregular limestone rocks. They furnish excellent dates. Barley is also cultivated. The northern valleys are inhabited by a settled population of Gouran stock, known as the Daza; the others are mainly visited by nomadic Berber and Arab tribes. The inhabitants own large numbers of goats and asses.

A caravan route from Barca and the Kufra oasis passes through Bourku to Lake Chad. The country long remained unknown to Europeans. Gustav Nachtigal spent some time in it in the year 1871, and gave a valuable account of the region and its inhabitants in his book, Sahara and the Sudan (1879–1889). In 1899 Bourku, by agreement with Great Britain, was assigned to the French sphere of influence. The country, which had formerly been periodically raided by the Walad Sliman Arabs, was then governed by the Senussi, who had placed garrisons in the chief centres of population. From it raids were made on French territory. In 1907 a French column from Kanem entered Bourku, but after capturing Am Galakka, the principal Senussi station, retired.

References

Geography of Central Africa
Geography of Chad
Regions of Africa